Samoljica is a village in the municipality of Bujanovac, Serbia. According to the 2002 census, the town has a population of 17421. Of these, 1373 (98,09 %) were ethnic Albanians, 12 (1,34 %) were Serbs, 1 (0,11 %) Bosniak, and 4 (0,44 %) others.

References

Populated places in Pčinja District
Albanian communities in Serbia